David Kushner or Dave Kushner may be:
David Kushner (writer)
David Kushner (artist)
Dave Kushner, (born 1966), rock guitarist